is a 1950 black-and-white Japanese film directed by Ren Yoshimura (吉村廉).

Cast

References

External links 

Japanese black-and-white films
1950 films
Daiei Film films
Japanese drama films
1950 drama films
1950s Japanese films